Jye Caldwell (born 28 September 2000) is a professional Australian rules footballer playing for the Essendon Football Club in the Australian Football League (AFL). He was recruited by the Greater Western Sydney Giants with pick 11 in the 2018 national draft.

Early life
Caldwell participated in the Auskick program at Golden Square and played his junior football with Golden Square before progressing to the Bendigo Pioneers in the TAC Cup. He represented Victoria Country at the 2018 AFL Under 18 Championships. Apart from football Caldwell was also a talented junior boxer.

AFL career
Caldwell was recruited by the Greater Western Sydney Giants with pick 11 in the 2018 national draft. Ironically, this pick was originally from Essendon as part of the Dylan Shiel trade.

He made his senior debut in the 56-point loss against Hawthorn, in round 21 of the 2019 AFL season at Manuka Oval.

He was traded on November 12, the final day of trade period.

AFL statistics
Statistics correct to round 23, 2022.

|-
! scope="row" style="text-align:center" | 2019
| style="text-align:center;" | 
| 5 || 2 || 0 || 0 || 13 || 10 || 23 || 7 || 9 || 0.0 || 0.0 || 6.5 || 5.0 || 11.5 || 3.5 || 4.5
|- style="background-color: #EAEAEA"
! scope="row" style="text-align:center" | 2020
| style="text-align:center;" | 
| 5 || 9 || 1 || 2 || 56 || 58 || 114 || 27 || 33 || 0.1 || 0.2 || 6.2 || 6.4 || 12.6 || 3.0 || 3.7
|-
! scope="row" style="text-align:center" | 2021
| style="text-align:center;" | 
| 6 || 2 || 0 || 1 || 18 || 14 || 32 || 6 || 12 || 0.0 || 0.5 || 9.0 || 7.0 || 16.0 || 3.0 || 6.0
|-
! scope="row" style="text-align:center" | 2022
| style="text-align:center;" | 
| 6 || 20 || 6 || 8 || 175 || 200 || 375 || 67 || 86 || 0.3 || 0.4 || 8.7 || 10.0 || 18.7 || 3.3 || 4.3
|- class="sortbottom"
! colspan=3 | Career
! 34
! 7
! 11
! 262
! 282
! 544
! 107
! 138
! 0.2
! 0.3
! 7.7
! 8.2
! 16.0
! 3.1
! 4.0
|}

References

External links

Greater Western Sydney Giants players
Australian rules footballers from Victoria (Australia)
Bendigo Pioneers players
2000 births
Living people
Essendon Football Club players